Hajj Ali Hiki (also Romanized as Ḩājī ‘Alī Hīkī; also known as Boneh-ye Ḩājī ‘Alī, Boneh-ye Ḩājjī ‘Alī, and Ḩājjī ‘Alī Hīkī) is a village in Qilab Rural District, Alvar-e Garmsiri District, Andimeshk County, Khuzestan Province, Iran. At the 2006 census, its population was 72, in 11 families.

References 

Populated places in Andimeshk County